Prince Albert City Council is the governing body of Prince Albert, Saskatchewan, Canada.

Composition

The Council consists of the City's Mayor and eight elected City Councilors, with City Councilors representing the interests of each of the eight wards of the City.

History

The Council's history dates back to the incorporation of Prince Albert Settlement as a town in 1885, under its first mayor; Thomas McKay.

Council members

Mayor
Peter Gregory Dionne is the current mayor of Prince Albert, Saskatchewan and head of the City Council.

Ward 1

Charlene Miller is the current councillor representing Ward 1, which encompasses the West Flat area of the City. Ward 1 currently has the highest percentage of youth of any ward in Prince Albert and is rebranding itself as a vibrant desirable place to live. Ward 1 runs adjacent the North Saskatchewan River and hosts a large portion of the Rotary Trail.

Ward 2

Terra Lennox-Zepp is the current councilor representing Ward 2, which encompasses the Historical Cathedral District, Prince Albert's downtown core, as well as Hazedell, Nordale, and the North Industrial district north of the North Saskatchewan River.

Ward 3

Tony Head is the current councillor representing Ward 3 which includes the Midtown area of the East Flat portion of the City.

Ward 4

Past mayor Don Cody is the current councillor representing Ward 4 which encompasses the eastern portion of the East Flat area of the City.

Ward 5

Dennis Ogrodnick is the current councillor representing Ward 5 which encompasses the Crescent Heights area of the City, as well as parts of the Carlton Park neighbourhood.

Ward 6

Blake Edwards is the current councillor representing Ward 6 which encompasses the Crescent Acres and Carlton Park neighbourhoods on the east side of the City.

Ward 7

The Ward 7 seat currently held by Dawn Kilmer. Ward 7 includes the East Hill neighbourhood of the City.

Ward 8

Ted Zurakowski is the current councilor for Ward 8 which encompasses the West Hill neighborhoods of the city.  Zurkakowski has taken a position with the Saskatchewan Teachers' Federation in which he has vacated he has vacated his seat effective February 1.

See also
Politics of Saskatchewan

References

External links
 City of Prince Albert Ward Map (Archived copy)

Municipal councils in Saskatchewan
Politics of Prince Albert, Saskatchewan